Lauren Halliwell (born 5 March 1989) plays for Great Britain women's national ice hockey team as defenceman.

References

1989 births
Living people
English women's ice hockey players